Nijemo kolo is a silent dance originating from the Dalmatian hinterland in southern Croatia. In 2011 it was inscribed on the UNESCO Intangible Cultural Heritage Lists.

Description
Nijemo kolo is performed by a group forming a closed circle with the men leading their female partners in quick steps, which are often vigorous and daunting. The most noticeable aspect of the dance is that it performed entirely without music.

Today, Nijemo kolo continues to be performed by local village groups and can be seen in festivals, competitions, fairs, church celebrations, and weddings.

See also
 Croatian dances
 Kolo (dance)

References

External links 

  (UNESCO video)

Croatian folk dances
Masterpieces of the Oral and Intangible Heritage of Humanity